Cowork at the Michigan is a shared coworking space in the historic Michigan Building. The Michigan Building was the former Michigan Theatre Building located in downtown Detroit, Michigan until it closed in 1976. This coworking space is one of the first major projects the building has taken on since going into decay in the late-1970s.

References

Office buildings in Detroit